Magiting at Pusakal is a 1972 Filipino action film starring Fernando Poe Jr. and Joseph Estrada. Directed by Augusto Buenaventura and co-written by Buenaventura and Ruben Rustia, the film is about Leon and Joe, two fugitives of contrasting personalities who try to avoid capture during the Japanese occupation of the Philippines. Produced by Joseph Estrada Productions, the film was released in the Philippines on April 15, 1972, and was later given a re-release in 1988.

Cast
Fernando Poe Jr. as Leon Magsalin
Joseph Estrada as Joe Ronquillo
Rosanna Ortiz as Salome
Jeanne Young
Ruben Rustia as Kalayaan
Angelo Ventura
Jesse Lee
Ruel Vernal
Jon Mariano
Bert Lafortaza
Avel Morado
Blanco Santos
Vic Gaza
Pecos Lachica
SOS Daredevils
TNT Boys

Release
Magiting at Pusakal was originally released in the Philippines on April 15, 1972. The film was later given a re-release in wet season 1988.

Critical response
Upon the film's re-release in 1988, Lav Diaz gave the film a mixed review, criticizing the credits and action sequences as lacking ("A few blasts of the heroes' guns, already so many enemies are falling down") while praising the film's timely themes and Joseph Estrada's ability to deliver amusing one-liners as the "pusakal" (a person addicted to stealing and gambling).

References

External links

1972 films
Films set in the 1940s
Philippine action films
Tagalog-language films
Films set in the Philippines
World War II films